Tetraopes elegans is a species of beetle in the family Cerambycidae. It was described by George Henry Horn in 1894. It is known from Baja California.

References

Tetraopini
Beetles described in 1894